Liu Yi (born 7 July 2003) is a Chinese badminton player. He won his first senior title at the Vietnam International Series in 2022 with his partner Chen Boyang.

Career 
He won his first tournament at the Vietnam International Series with Chen Boyang. A week later, Liu won his second consecutive title at the Malaysia International Series tournament.

In March 2023, Liu and Chen won their first BWF World Tour title at the 2023 Ruichang China Masters.

Achievements

BWF World Tour (1 title) 
The BWF World Tour, which was announced on 19 March 2017 and implemented in 2018, is a series of elite badminton tournaments sanctioned by the Badminton World Federation (BWF). The BWF World Tours are divided into levels of World Tour Finals, Super 1000, Super 750, Super 500, Super 300, and the BWF Tour Super 100.

Men's doubles

BWF International Challenge/Series (2 titles) 
Men's doubles

  BWF International Challenge tournament
  BWF International Series tournament
  BWF Future Series tournament

References

External links 

 

2003 births
Living people
Badminton players from Jiangxi
Chinese male badminton players
21st-century Chinese people